The Little Compton Commons Historic District, or Little Compton Commons, is a historic district in Little Compton, Rhode Island. It is a triangular area roughly bounded by School House Lane to the north, South Commons Road to the east, and Meeting House Lane to the south. Properties continue to the west on West Road.

History 

The district features a variety of Greek Revival and Victorian buildings, including the United Congregational Church, whose tall steeple dominates the landscape; the First Methodist Meeting House; the Little Compton Town Hall and a former schoolhouse, now connected; Sakonnet Lodge, formerly a Methodist Church; the Little Compton Community Center, formerly Grange Hall; the Brownell Library; a restaurant; and C. R. Wilbur's General Merchandise store; among others.

At the center of the district is the town common itself; one of only two remaining in Rhode Island. It contains a large colonial cemetery with many graves, including those of American Revolutionary War veterans and other notable individuals.   Nearby is Union Cemetery – also part of the historic district – which features a Civil War Memorial.

The district was added to the National Register of Historic Places in 1974.

Notable burials
Benjamin Church, hero of King Philip's War, father of United States Army Rangers
Elizabeth Pabodie, the first European woman born in New England, the daughter of Mayflower Pilgrims

Gallery

See also
National Register of Historic Places listings in Newport County, Rhode Island

References

External links

United Congregational Church in Little Compton
Buxton, Wilson R. et al. The Two-hundredth anniversary of the organization of the United Congregational Church, Little Compton, Rhode Island, September 7, 1904 United Congregational Society, 1906

Churches on the National Register of Historic Places in Rhode Island
Historic districts in Newport County, Rhode Island
Little Compton, Rhode Island
Cemeteries in Rhode Island
Historic districts on the National Register of Historic Places in Rhode Island
National Register of Historic Places in Newport County, Rhode Island